Charles Crocker (September 16, 1822 – August 14, 1888) was an American railroad executive who was one of the founders of the Central Pacific Railroad, which constructed the westernmost portion of the first transcontinental railroad, and took control with partners of the Southern Pacific Railroad.

Early years
Crocker was born in Troy, New York on September 16, 1822.  He was the son of Eliza (née Wright) and Isaac Crocker, a modest family. They joined the nineteenth-century migration west and moved to Indiana when he was 14, where they had a farm.  Crocker soon became independent, working on several farms, a sawmill, and at an iron forge.

At the age of 23, in 1845, he founded a small, independent iron forge of his own. He used money saved from his earnings to invest later in the new railroad business after moving to California, which had become a boom state since the Gold Rush.  His older brother Edwin B. Crocker had become an attorney by the time Crocker was investing in railroads.

Founding a railroad

In 1861, after hearing an intriguing presentation by Theodore Judah, he was one of the four principal investors, along with Mark Hopkins, Collis Huntington and Leland Stanford (also known as The Big Four), who formed the Central Pacific Railroad, which constructed the western portion of the First transcontinental railroad in North America. His position with the company was that of construction supervisor and president of Charles Crocker & Co., a Central Pacific subsidiary founded expressly for the purpose of building the railroad.

Crocker bought train plows to plow the tracks of snow through the mountains, but they derailed due to ice on the tracks. This project cost over $2 million.

In 1864, Charles asked his older brother Edwin to serve as legal counsel for the Central Pacific Railroad.

While the Central Pacific was still under construction in 1868, Crocker and his three associates acquired control of the Southern Pacific Railroad. It built the westernmost portion of the second transcontinental railroad. Deming, New Mexico, is named after his wife, Mary Ann Deming Crocker. A silver spike was driven here in 1881 to commemorate the meeting of the Southern Pacific with the Atchison, Topeka and Santa Fe railroads, completing the construction of the second transcontinental railroad in the United States.
On September 5, 1876 at the Lang Southern Pacific Station, a California Historic Landmark, Crocker hammered a golden spike into a railroad tie, the ceremonial spike was driven to celebrate the completion of San Joaquin Valley rail line. The completion of the line connected the City of Los Angeles with San Francisco and First transcontinental railroad line.

Banking
Crocker was briefly the controlling shareholder of Wells Fargo in 1869 and served as president. After he sold down, he was replaced by John J. Valentine, Sr. Crocker also acquired controlling interest for his son William in Woolworth National Bank, which was renamed Crocker-Anglo Bank.

In 1963, Crocker-Anglo Bank merged with Los Angeles' Citizens National Bank, to become Crocker-Citizens Bank and later, Crocker National Bank. The San Francisco-based bank no longer exists, as it was acquired by Wells Fargo in 1986.

Nob Hill and the 40 foot tall spite fence
Crocker built a mansion on Nob Hill. When his attempts to buy Nicholas Yung's adjacent property were rebuffed, he built a 40-foot spite fence around three sides of the neighbor's property.  Legal challenges to the fence were unavailing.  The feud lasted many years, and the fence was only removed after the death of Mrs. Yung, and the sale of the property by Yung's heirs to Crocker's family. Spite fences were thereafter made illegal in San Francisco. The mansion was destroyed in the 1906 San Francisco earthquake. Though the disaster rendered the infamous dispute and its resolution moot, Crocker's family donated the entire block of land to charity, in support of the Episcopal Diocese of California. In 1910, in the same plot where the fence stood, the cornerstone was laid for Grace Cathedral.

Personal life

In 1852, Crocker was married to Mary Ann Deming (1827–1889).  Mary was the daughter of John Jay Deming and Emily (née Reed) Deming.  Together, they had six children, four of whom survived to adulthood:

 Charles Frederick Crocker (1854–1897), who married Jennie Ella Easton (1858–1887).
 George Crocker (1856–1909), who married Emma Hanchett (1855–1904).
 Harriet Valentine Crocker (1859–1935), who married Charles Beatty Alexander (1849–1927).
 William Henry Crocker (1861–1937), who married Ethel Sperry (1861–1934).

Crocker was seriously injured in a New York City carriage accident in 1886, never fully recovered, and died two years later on August 14, 1888. He was buried in a mausoleum located on "Millionaire's Row" at Mountain View Cemetery in Oakland, California. The massive granite structure was designed by the New York architect A. Page Brown, who later designed the San Francisco Ferry Building. Crocker's estate has been valued at between $300 million and $400 million at the time of his death in 1888.

Descendants
Through his son Charles, he was the grandfather of Mary Crocker (1881–1905), who married U.S. Congressman Francis Burton Harrison; Charles Templeton Crocker (1884–1948); and Jennie Adeline Crocker (1887–1974).

Through his daughter Harriet, he was the grandfather of Mary Crocker Alexander (1895–1986), who married diplomat Sheldon Whitehouse.  Their son was Charles Sheldon Whitehouse (1921–2001), the United States Ambassador to Laos and Thailand, and their grandson, Crocker's great-great-grandson, is U.S. Senator Sheldon Whitehouse of Rhode Island.

Through his son William, he was the grandfather of Charles Crocker, William Willard Crocker, Helen Crocker (Russell) and Ethel Mary Crocker (de Limur).

Family tree

Honors
Mount Crocker is named in his honor. It is located in California's Sierra Nevada mountains.

References

External links

1822 births
1888 deaths
American railway entrepreneurs
19th-century American railroad executives
Businesspeople from San Francisco
Southern Pacific Railroad people
Businesspeople from Troy, New York
Nob Hill, San Francisco
New York (state) Republicans
California Republicans
Burials at Mountain View Cemetery (Oakland, California)
Crocker family